Elionurus elegans is a species of plants in the family Poaceae. It is found in Nigeria, Senegal and Burkina Faso. It is used as a fodder plant. Its essential oils from the aerial parts contain the terpenic compounds campherenone (43.0%), caryophyllene oxide (4.9%) and bisabolone (4.9%) whereas root essential oils contain campherenone (39.0%), epi-beta-santalene (12.0%) and caryophyllene oxide (4.6%).

References

External links
 
 Elionurus elegans at Tropicos

Andropogoneae
Plants described in 1830